The Toyota New Global Architecture (abbreviated as TNGA) are modular automobile platforms that underpin various Toyota and Lexus models starting with the fourth-generation Prius in late 2015. TNGA platforms accommodate different vehicle sizes and also front-, rear- and all-wheel drive configurations.

The platforms were developed as part of a company-wide effort to simplify the vehicles being produced by Toyota. Before the introduction of the TNGA, Toyota was building roughly 100 different platform variants. , the five TNGA platforms underpin more than 50% of Toyota vehicles sold worldwide and is expected to underpin about 80% by 2023.

Each platform is based on a standardized seat height that allows for sharing of key interior components such as steering systems, shifters, pedals, seat frames and airbags. These components are often less visible, allowing for cars that share platforms to have unique interiors. Compared to Toyota's older platforms, TNGA costs 20 percent less to produce while offering increased chassis stiffness, lower centers of gravity for better handling and lower hood cowls for better forward visibility.

The TNGA platform was developed alongside the Dynamic Force engine, which similarly is replacing more than 800 engine variants with a much simpler lineup of 17 versions of nine engines. Toyota is also simplifying its lineup of transmissions, hybrid systems, and all-wheel drive systems.



Applications

TNGA-B (GA-B) 
The TNGA-B platform underpins unibody vehicles in the A-segment or city car, B-segment or subcompact car, subcompact crossover SUV, and mini MPV categories. The platform is offered in both front-wheel drive and all-wheel drive variants and is paired with a transverse engine. TNGA-B replaces the older B platform.

Vehicles using platform (calendar years):
 Toyota Aqua — XP210 (2021–present)
 Toyota Aygo X — AB70 (2022–present)
 Toyota Sienta — XP210 (2022–present)
 Toyota Yaris — XP210 (2020–present)
 Toyota GR Yaris — XP210 (2020–present; with the rear from GA-C platform)
 Mazda2 Hybrid — XP210 (2022–present)
 Toyota Yaris Cross — XP210 (2020–present)

TNGA-C (GA-C) 
The TNGA-C platform underpins unibody vehicles in the C-segment or compact car, subcompact/compact crossover SUV, and compact/mid-size MPV categories. The platform is offered in both front-wheel drive and all-wheel drive variants and is paired with a transverse engine. TNGA-C replaces the older MC/New MC platform.

Vehicles using platform (calendar years):
 Toyota Corolla — E210 (2018–present)
 Toyota Allion — E210 (2021–present)
 Toyota Auris — E210 (2018–2020)
 Toyota Levin — E210 (2019–present)
 Toyota GR Corolla — E210 (2022–present)
 Suzuki Swace — E210 (2020–present)
 Toyota Corolla Cross — XG10 (2020–present)
 Toyota Frontlander  — XG10 (2021–present)
 Toyota C-HR — AX10/AX50 (2016–present)
 Toyota IZOA — AX10 (2017–present)
 Toyota Innova — AG10 (2022–present)
 Toyota Kijang Innova Zenix — AG10 (2022–present)
 Toyota Noah — R90 (2022–present)
 Toyota Voxy — R90 (2022–present)
 Suzuki Landy — R90 (2022–present)
 Toyota Prius — XW50 (2015–2022)
 Toyota Prius Plug-in Hybrid/Prime — XW50 (2016–2022)
 Toyota Prius — XW60 (2022–present)
 Toyota Prius Plug-in Hybrid/Prime —  XW60 (2023–present)
 Lexus UX — ZA10 (2018–present)

TNGA-F (GA-F) 
The TNGA-F platform underpins body-on-frame vehicles in the full-size SUV and full-size pickup truck categories, and is also expected to underpin future mid-sized pickup trucks as well as mid-sized SUVs.

Vehicles using platform (calendar years):
 Toyota Land Cruiser — J300 (2021–present)
 Lexus LX — J310 (2021–present)
 Toyota Sequoia — XK80 (2022–present)
 Toyota Tundra — XK70 (2021–present)

TNGA-K (GA-K) 
The TNGA-K platform underpins unibody vehicles in the D-segment or mid-size car, E-segment or full-size car, compact/mid-size crossover SUV, and large MPV categories. The platform is offered in both front-wheel drive and all-wheel drive variants and is paired with a transverse engine. TNGA-K replaces the older K platform.

Vehicles using platform (calendar years):
 Toyota Avalon — XX50 (2018–present)
 Toyota Camry — XV70 (2017–present)
 Daihatsu Altis — XV70 (2017–present)
 Toyota Crown Crossover — S235 (2022–present)

 Toyota Harrier — XU80 (2020–present)
 Toyota Venza — XU80 (2020–present)
 Toyota Highlander — XU70 (2019–present)
 Toyota Crown Kluger — XU70 (2021–present)
 Toyota Kluger — XU70 (2021–present)
 Toyota RAV4 — XA50 (2018–present)
 Toyota Wildlander — XA50 (2019–present)
 Suzuki Across — XA50 (2020–present)
 Toyota Sienna — XL40 (2020–present)
 Toyota Granvia — XL40 (2022–present)
 Lexus ES — XZ10 (2018–present)
 Lexus NX — AZ20 (2021–present)
 Lexus RX — ALA10/ALH10 (2022–present)

TNGA-L (GA-L) 
The TNGA-L platform underpins unibody vehicles in the E-segment or executive car, F-segment or full-size luxury car, and S-segment or grand tourer categories. The platform is offered in both rear-wheel drive and all-wheel drive variants and is paired with a longitudinal engine. TNGA-L replaces the older N platform.

Vehicles using platform (calendar years):
 Toyota Crown — S220 (2018–2022)
 Toyota Mirai — JPD20 (2020–present)
 Lexus LC — Z100 (2017–present)
 Lexus LS — XF50 (2017–present)

e-TNGA 
e-TNGA is a modular platform dedicated to battery electric vehicles, which was announced in October 2019. Internally known as the 40PL platform, the platform will enable offering various type and size of vehicles, different battery capacity and with front-wheel drive, rear-wheel drive or dual motor all-wheel drive. This vehicle architecture is partitioned into five modules. These are the front module, center module, rear module, battery and motor. Up to three versions of each module are in development, including three capacities for the lithium-ion battery. The first e-TNGA-based model is the bZ4X crossover, which was presented for the first time in April 2021. Other vehicles planned by 2025 include a medium SUV, a medium minivan, a medium sedan, and a large SUV. For Subaru-badged models, the platform is also known as the e-Subaru Global Platform (e-SGP).

Vehicles using platform (calendar years):
 Toyota bZ3 (2023)
 Toyota bZ4X — EA10 (2022–present)
 Subaru Solterra (2022–present)
 Lexus RZ (2022–present)

See also 
 Toyota Dynamic Force engine
 Daihatsu New Global Architecture

References

External links 

  (global)

New Global Architecture